The 2022 ASUN women's basketball tournament was the conference postseason tournament for the ASUN Conference. This was the 43rd season in which the league has conducted a postseason tournament. The tournament was held March 2, 6, 9, and 12, 2022, at campus sites of the higher seeds. Florida Gulf Coast, winners of the conference's East Division and also with the best overall conference record, won the tournament and with it the conference's automatic bid to the NCAA tournament.

Seeds 
All teams in the conference qualified for the tournament. Teams were seeded by their record in conference play, with a tiebreaker system to seed teams with identical conference records. The top two teams from each division received byes into the quarterfinals.

The two tiebreakers used by the ASUN are: 1) head-to-head record of teams with identical record and 2) NCAA NET Rankings available on day following the conclusion of ASUN regular-season play. These tiebreakers are also used to determine home court should teams with identical divisional seedings and conference records advance to the championship game (which happened in the 2022 ASUN men's tournament).

Schedule

Bracket 
If North Alabama or Bellarmine had won the ASUN Tournament, the conference's top overall seed, Florida Gulf Coast, would have claimed the automatic bid to the NCAA Tournament. However, both lost their first tournament games.

References 

2021–22 ASUN Conference women's basketball season
ASUN women's basketball tournament
ASUN men's basketball tournament